Evangelos Oikonomakos (born 14 July 1945) is a Greek boxer. He competed at the 1968 Summer Olympics and the 1972 Summer Olympics.

References

External links
 

1945 births
Living people
Greek male boxers
Olympic boxers of Greece
Boxers at the 1968 Summer Olympics
Boxers at the 1972 Summer Olympics
Sportspeople from Athens
Light-middleweight boxers
20th-century Greek people